Kuwait Motor Town is a  motor racing circuit in Kuwait, located  south of the capital Kuwait City. The main circuit is the first circuit in Kuwait to hold an FIA Grade One and FIM Grade A licence. The Kuwait Motor Town aims to place Kuwait at the forefront of world-class motorsport events.

History
The circuit was penned by Formula One circuit designer Hermann Tilke in early 2017. Construction was undertaken by KCC Engineering and Contracting Company at a reported cost of KWD49 million (US$162 million). Circuit construction was completed in December 2018 with the circuit opening in 2019. Further development around the circuit is set to take place, including an "Entertainment City" shopping centre. The track is the longest race track in the Middle East.

The first event held at the circuit was the opening round of the 2019 Middle East Rally Championship on March 28. 

In terms of international auto racing series, 24H Series was the first event, which was held on 2 December 2022.

Events 

 Current
 January: Formula Regional Middle East Championship, Formula 4 UAE Championship
 February: Formula Regional Middle East Championship, Formula 4 UAE Championship
 December: 24H Series Hankook 12H Kuwait

Lap records

The official fastest race lap records at Kuwait Motor Town are listed as:

See also
 Kuwait National Cultural District

Notes

References

External links
 Kuwait Motor Town website (in Arabic)

Kuwait Motor Town
Kuwait Motor Town
Entertainment venues in Kuwait
Racing circuits designed by Hermann Tilke